José Jesús Perera López (born 12 April 1980) is a Spanish former footballer who played as a striker.

He played 186 Segunda División games over eight seasons, scoring a combined 60 goals for Mallorca B, Albacete, Celta, Rayo Vallecano and Elche. He added in 66 matches and 12 goals in La Liga, in an 18-year professional career.

Club career
Perera was born in Olivenza, Province of Badajoz. A prolific scorer in the second division, notably scoring 22 league goals for Albacete Balompié in the 2002–03 season, he struggled to maintain the same rate in the top flight in his four La Liga campaigns (two with both RCD Mallorca and RC Celta de Vigo). His best input came in 2003–04, as he netted six times for the Balearic Islands club.

In the 2007–08 season, Perera scored 15 league goals for a Galician squad that failed to return to the top level – he would immediately change teams again, joining Rayo Vallecano. Rarely used during the campaign, he was loaned in July 2009 two another side in that tier, Elche CF, in a season-long move; the deal was made permanent in August 2010.

In July 2011, Perera signed with CD Atlético Baleares of the third level. In his first and only full season he netted 23 goals in only 32 matches, but his team failed to promote eventually.

In January 2013, Perera joined another club in division three, Gimnàstic de Tarragona. After one-and-a-half seasons with the Catalans, he left after the expiry of his contract.

On 29 August 2014, Perera signed for Mérida AD in the fourth tier. He was top scorer with 23 goals in his first season as they won promotion, but retired at the age of 36 at the conclusion of the following campaign, in which he was troubled by a knee injury.

Honours

Individual
Pichichi Trophy (Segunda División): 2002–03

References

External links

1980 births
Living people
People from Olivenza
Sportspeople from the Province of Badajoz
Spanish footballers
Footballers from Extremadura
Association football forwards
La Liga players
Segunda División players
Segunda División B players
Tercera División players
RCD Mallorca B players
RCD Mallorca players
Albacete Balompié players
RC Celta de Vigo players
Rayo Vallecano players
Elche CF players
CD Atlético Baleares footballers
Gimnàstic de Tarragona footballers
Mérida AD players